Shane Edwin Sutton OBE (born 13 June 1957 in Moree, New South Wales) is an Australian-born former professional racing cyclist turned cycling coach, whose last position was as Technical Director for British Cycling.

Racing career
He rode under Phil Griffiths as a member of the first British-based professional team to enter the Tour de France in 1987 and went on to win the 1990 Milk Race. Sutton was also one of the four men to win gold in the team pursuit for Australia at the 1978 Commonwealth Games along with his brother, Gary Sutton.

Coaching career
After retiring Shane worked as a coach with Welsh Cycling, taking the team to a successful Manchester Commonwealth Games before joining the British Cycling set-up in 2002. He was also employed as head coach at Team Sky but scaled back his involvement to become a part-time performance adviser for the professional team in 2013. Following the departure of Dave Brailsford from his role as British Cycling's Performance Director in April 2014, Sutton was promoted from his previous position as head coach to the newly created role of Technical Director.

Sutton resigned from British Cycling in 2016, after allegations of discrimination were made against him by Paralympic gold medalist Darren Kenny and cyclist Jessica Varnish. Sutton has consistently protested his innocence. An internal investigation by British Cycling upheld one of nine accusations of discriminatory language. UK Sport, the UK national sport funding body, expressed serious concerns over British Cycling's handling of the investigation.

Awards
Shane was awarded the accolade of Sports Council for Wales' (now Sport Wales) Coach of the Year Award in 1998.

Sutton won the "Coach of the Year Award" at the sports coach UK Coaching Awards in December 2008. He was also one of seven coaches to win a "High Performance Coach of the Year" award.

Sutton was appointed Officer of the Order of the British Empire (OBE) in the 2010 Birthday Honours.

Results

1978
 Team Pursuit Commonwealth Games (with Colin Fitzgerald, Kevin Nichols and Gary Sutton)

1981
5th Herald Sun Tour
Fastest time Goulburn to Sydney Classic

1982
55th World Road Race Championships
1st Bendigo International Madison (with Danny Clark)

1983
3rd Australian National Road Race Championships
1st Herald Sun Tour
1st Stage 2, Herald Sun Tour
1st Stage 6, Herald Sun Tour
1st Stage 11, Herald Sun Tour
1st Stage 16, Herald Sun Tour
1st Bendigo International Madison (with Gary Sutton)
1st and fastest time Goulburn to Sydney Classic

1984
3rd Australian National Road Race Championships
5th Beeston
1st Newport
1st Stage 10, Griffin 1000
8th Herald Sun Tour
1st Stage 2, Herald Sun Tour

1985
3rd Sealink International
1st Stage 8, Sealink International

1986
3rd  Milk Race

1987
9th Norwich Spring Classic
15th Tour of Ireland
1st Stage 18, Herald Sun Tour

1988
10th  Milk Race
5th Herald Sun Tour
1st Stage 8, Herald Sun Tour

1989
9th Herald Sun Tour
1st Stage 5, Herald Sun Tour
2nd Stage 10, Herald Sun Tour

1990
1st  in General Classification Milk Race
1st Stage 3, Milk Race

1991
4th Mazda Alpine Tour

1993
 3rd British National Road Race Championships

References

1957 births
Living people
Australian cycling coaches
Australian male cyclists
Cyclists at the 1978 Commonwealth Games
Officers of the Order of the British Empire
Cyclists from New South Wales
New South Wales Institute of Sport alumni
People from the North West Slopes
Commonwealth Games gold medallists for Australia
Commonwealth Games medallists in cycling
Medallists at the 1978 Commonwealth Games